Stobo Castle is located at Stobo in the Scottish Borders, in the former county of Peeblesshire. The Manor of Stobo was originally owned by the Balfour family. It became the family seat of the Graham-Montgomery Baronets from 1767. The building of the present castle began in 1805 and was completed in 1811 under the supervision of architects Archibald and James Elliot. It is currently operated as a health spa. The house is protected as a category A listed building,  while the grounds are included in the Inventory of Gardens and Designed Landscapes in Scotland, the national listing of significant parks and gardens.

History

Stobo Castle is the seat of the barony of Stobo, a feudal lordship that was created in 1577 with origins dating back to the twelfth century.

In 1650 (together with Dawyck House) Stobo estate was the first in Scotland to introduce the non-native species of horse chestnut.

A tower house, known as Hill House, formerly stood on the site of Stobo Castle. The Stobo estate was owned by the Murrays of Tweedsmuir around 1750. In 1767, the Stobo estate and its barony were bought by James Montgomery, a judge who served as Lord Advocate and Lord Chief Baron of the Scottish Exchequer from 1775. He was created a Baronet in 1801. On his death in 1803, his son James inherited the estate, and commissioned a new house from the architect James Elliot (brother and partner of Archibald Elliot). Stobo Castle was constructed between 1805 and 1811 in a castellated style. In 1849, the porte-cochère was added by Sir Graham Graham-Montgomery, 3rd Baronet, to a design by John Lessels. Sir Graham also had the grounds redesigned by John Hay in 1872.

In 1905, Stobo was sold to the English cricketer Hylton Philipson. A keen gardener, Philipson laid out the Japanese-influenced water gardens and terraces, and formed three large lakes on the estate. In 1939, after Philipson's death, the estate was sold again to Wenefryde Scott, 10th Countess of Dysart.

In the post-war years, the estate was subdivided, and the contents of the house were auctioned by Sotheby's in April 1972. Stobo Castle was purchased in 1975 by the Winyard family, who established a health resort. A large extension, incorporating new hotel rooms and a swimming pool, was opened in 2003.

As a result of these property disposals, the barony of Stobo is now held independently of ownership of either the castle or its surrounding lands (the Stobo Estate).

In late 2020, the 3,884-acre Stobo Estate was put up for sale with an asking price of £12 million. It was subsequently sold in seven lots and broken up.

See also
 List of Category A listed buildings in the Scottish Borders
 List of listed buildings in Stobo, Scottish Borders 
Stobo Kirk

References

External links
Stobo Castle website

Castles in the Scottish Borders
Category A listed buildings in the Scottish Borders
Destination spas
Hotel spas
Hotels in the Scottish Borders
Houses completed in 1811
Houses in the Scottish Borders
Inventory of Gardens and Designed Landscapes
Listed castles in Scotland
1811 establishments in Scotland
Hotels established in 2003
2003 establishments in Scotland